People's Park in Berkeley, California is located just east of Telegraph Avenue, bounded by Haste and Bowditch Streets, and Dwight Way, near the University of California, Berkeley. The park was created during the radical political activism of the late 1960s.

The local Southside neighborhood was the scene of a major confrontation between student protesters and police in May 1969. A mural near the park, painted by Berkeley artist O'Brien Thiele and lawyer/artist Osha Neumann, depicts the history of the park and the shooting of James Rector, who was fatally shot by police on May 15, 1969.

While the land is the property of the University of California, People's Park has operated since the early 1970s as a free public park. The City of Berkeley declared it a historical and cultural landmark in 1984. It is often viewed as a sanctuary for Berkeley's low income and large homeless population who, along with others, received meals from East Bay Food Not Bombs regularly. Many social welfare organizations do outreach at the park, like the Suitcase Clinic. Nearby Berkeley residents partake in regularly scheduled activities around the park like gardening, musical performances, and movie nights.

In response to UC Berkeley's renewed plan to build student housing on the site, the Defend People's Park movement formed, organizing events, direct actions, mutual aid, and classes in the park since a student occupation began in early 2021. A People's Park Historic District Advocacy Group also formed and pursued national recognition for the park. The park was listed on the National Register of Historic Places in 2022.

On July 29, 2022, a judge ruled in favor of the UC Berkeley construction project. Deforestation work began just after midnight on August 3, 2022, which was meet with protests by community members opposed to the redevelopment effort. Protesters were beaten by police and multiple were arrested. On August 5, California First District Court of Appeal upheld a stay order. This temporarily pauses construction, demolition, or tree-cutting at the site, but UC Berkeley has been permitted to erect barricades and fences, until the legal dispute is settled.

Early history to May 1969 

In 1956, the Regents of the University of California decided that they wanted to buy a certain  plot of land, which contained houses at the time, for future development into student housing, parking, and offices as part of the university's long range development plan. At the time, public funds were lacking to buy the land, and the plan was shelved until June 1967, when the university acquired $1.3 million to buy the land. The land was purchased through the process of eminent domain, which allows government bodies to legally force homeowners to sell their land. The short-term goal was to create athletic fields with student housing being a longer-range goal.

Bulldozers arrived February, 1968 and began demolition of the residences. But the university ran out of development funds, leaving the lot only partially cleared of demolition debris and rubble for 14 months. The muddy site became derelict with abandoned cars.

On April 13, 1969, local merchants and residents held a meeting to discuss possible uses for the derelict site. At the time, student activist Wendy Schlesinger and Michael Delacour (a former defense contractor employee who had become an anti-war activist) had become attached to the area, as they had been using it as a clandestine rendezvous hideout for a secret romantic affair. The pair of lovers presented a plan for developing the under-utilized, university-owned land into a public park. This plan was approved by the attendees, but not by the university. Stew Albert, a co-founder of the Yippie Party, agreed to write an article for the local counter-culture newspaper, the Berkeley Barb, on the subject of the park, particularly to call for help from local residents.

Michael Delacour stated, "We wanted a free speech area that wasn't really controlled like Sproul Plaza [the plaza at the south entrance to UC Berkeley] was. It was another place to organize, another place to have a rally. The park was secondary." The university's Free Speech microphone was available to all students, with few (if any) restrictions on speech. The construction of the park involved many of the same people and politics as the 1964 Free Speech Movement.

On April 18, 1969, Albert's article appeared in the Berkeley Barb, and on Sunday, April 20, more than 100 people arrived at the site to begin building the park. Local landscape architect Jon Read and many others contributed trees, flowers, shrubs, and sod. Free food was provided, and community development of the park proceeded. Eventually, about 1,000 people became directly involved, with many more donating money and materials. The park was essentially complete by mid-May.

On April 28, 1969, Berkeley Vice Chancellor Earl Cheit released plans for a sports field to be built on the site. This plan conflicted with the plans of the People's Park activists. However, Cheit stated that he would take no action without notifying the park builders.

Two days later, on April 30, Cheit allocated control over one quarter of the plot to the park's builders.

On May 6, Chancellor Roger W. Heyns met with members of the People's Park committee, student representatives, and faculty from the College of Environmental Design. He set a time limit of three weeks for this group to produce a plan for the park, and he reiterated his promise that construction would not begin without prior warning.

On May 13, Chancellor Heyns notified media via a press release that the university would build a fence around the property and begin construction.

May 15, 1969: "Bloody Thursday" 

Governor Ronald Reagan, who had been publicly critical of university administrators for tolerating student demonstrations at the Berkeley campus, sent California Highway Patrol and Berkeley police officers into People's Park on May 15, 1969, at 4:30 a.m. The action came at the request of Berkeley's mayor, Wallace J.S. Johnson. Beginning at noon about 3,000 people appeared in Sproul Plaza at nearby UC Berkeley for a rally, the original purpose of which was to discuss the Arab–Israeli conflict. The crowd later moved down Telegraph Avenue toward People's Park. Reagan's chief of staff, Edwin Meese III, assumed responsibility for the governmental response to the People's Park protest, and he called in the Alameda County Sheriff's deputies, which brought the total police presence to 791 officers from various jurisdictions.

James Rector was visiting friends in Berkeley and watching from the roof of Granma Books when he was shot by police; he died on May 19. A carpenter, Alan Blanchard, was permanently blinded by a load of birdshot directly to his face. At least 128 Berkeley residents were admitted to local hospitals for head trauma, shotgun wounds, and other serious injuries inflicted by police. One local hospital reported two students wounded with large caliber rifles as well. News reports at the time of the shooting stated that 50 people were injured, including five police officers. Some local hospital logs indicate that 19 police officers or Alameda County Sheriff's deputies were treated for minor injuries; none were hospitalized. However, the UCPD states that 111 police officers were injured, including one California Highway Patrol Officer, Albert Bradley, who was knifed in the chest.

That evening, Governor Reagan declared a state of emergency in Berkeley and sent in 2,700 National Guard troops. For two weeks, the streets of Berkeley were patrolled by National Guardsmen. Demonstrations continued for several days after Bloody Thursday. By May 26, the city-wide curfew and ban on gatherings had been lifted, although 200 members of the National Guard remained to guard the fenced-off park. On May 30, 1969, 30,000 Berkeley citizens (out of a population of 100,000) secured a city permit and marched without incident past the barricaded People's Park to protest Governor Reagan's occupation of their city and the casualties. Nevertheless, over the next few weeks National Guard troops broke up any assemblies of more than four people who congregated for any purpose on the streets of Berkeley, day or night. In the early summer, troops deployed in downtown Berkeley surrounded several thousand protesters and bystanders, emptying businesses, restaurants, and retail outlets of their owners and customers, and arresting them en masse.

1970s 

After the peaceful march in support of People's Park on May 30, 1969, the university decided to keep the 8-foot-tall perimeter chain-link wire fence and maintain a 24-hour guard over the site. On June 20, the University of California Regents voted to turn the People's Park site into a soccer field and parking lot.

In March 1971, when it seemed as though construction of the parking lot and soccer field might proceed, another People's Park protest occurred, resulting in 44 arrests.

In May 1972, an outraged crowd tore down the perimeter chain-link wire fence surrounding the People's Park site after President Richard Nixon announced his intention to mine North Vietnam's main port. In September, the Berkeley City Council voted to lease the park site from the university. The Berkeley community rebuilt the park, mainly with donated labor and materials. Various local groups contributed to managing the park during rebuilding.

In 1979, the university tried to convert the west end of the park, which was already a no-cost parking lot, into a fee lot for students and faculty only. The west end of the park was (and remains) the location of the People's Stage, a permanent bandstand that had just been erected on the edge of the lawn within the no-cost parking lot. Completed in the spring of 1979, it had been designed and constructed through user-development and voluntary community participation. This effort was coordinated by the People's Park Council, a democratic group of park advocates, and the People's Park Project/Native Plant Forum. Park users and organizers believed that the university's main purpose in attempting to convert the parking lot was the destruction of the People's Stage in order to suppress free speech and music, both in the park and in the neighborhood south of campus as a whole. It was also widely believed that the foray into the west end warned of the dispossession of the entire park for the purpose of university construction. A spontaneous protest in the fall of 1979 led to an occupation of the west end that continued uninterrupted throughout December 1979. Park volunteers tore up the asphalt and heaped it up as barricades next to the sidewalks along Dwight Way and Haste Street. This confrontation led to negotiations between the university and the park activists. The park activists were led by the People's Park Council, which included park organizers and occupiers, as well as other community members. The university eventually capitulated. Meanwhile, the occupiers, organizers, and volunteer gardeners transformed the former parking lot into a newly cultivated organic community gardening area, which remains to this day.

People's Park Annex/Ohlone Park 

In the immediate aftermath of the May 1969 People's Park demonstrations, and consistent with their goal of "letting a thousand parks bloom," on May 25, People's Park activists began gardening a two-block strip of land called the "Hearst Corridor," located adjacent to Hearst Avenue just northwest of the university campus. The Hearst Corridor was a strip of land along the north side of Hearst Avenue that had been left largely untended after the houses had been torn down to facilitate completion of an underground subway line by the Bay Area Rapid Transit (BART) District. Although BART officials offered to lease the site to the city for a park, on the night of June 6, approximately 400 people were forcibly evicted from what was then called "People's Park No. 2" by Berkeley police, who also removed playground equipment and trees that had been recently planted.

During the 1970s, local residents, especially George Garvin, pursued gardening and user development of this land, which became known as "People's Park Annex." Later on, additional volunteers donated time and energy to the Annex, led by David Axelrod and Charlotte Pyle, urban gardeners who were among the original organizers of the People's Park Project/Native Plant Forum.

As neighborhood and community groups stepped up their support for the preservation and development of the Annex, BART abandoned its original plan to build apartment complexes on Hearst Corridor. The City of Berkeley negotiated with BART to secure permanent above-ground rights to the entire five block strip of land, between Martin Luther King Jr. Way and Sacramento Avenue. By the early 1980s, this land had become a city park comprising , which residents decided to name "Ohlone Park" in honor of the Ohlone band of Native Americans who once lived there.

Today, the Berkeley Parks and Recreation Commission mediates neighborhood and community feedback concerning issues of park design and the maintenance, operation, and development of Ohlone Park amenities. These amenities—which include pedestrian and bicycle paths, children's playgrounds, a dog park, basketball and volleyball courts, a softball/soccer field, toilets, picnic areas, and community gardens—continue to serve the people and pets of Berkeley.

1990s: Volleyball Court and Resistance

Installation of Court 
In the spring of 1991, the university released plans to redevelop People's Park. They proposed removing the Free Speech Stage and installing several large volleyball courts throughout the park. Bulldozers were ushered in, accompanied by riot police, to install the sand volleyball courts.

A new wave of protest began, with the rallying slogan "Defend the Park," which was shared in coordinated solidarity with organizers resisting gentrification and the displacement of poor and unhoused people at Tompkins Square Park in the Lower East Side of New York City.

Emergency committees were established, such as the People's Park Defense Union. Nightly vigils and open meetings were held each night in the summer of 1991. An event hotline was also established to share information about rallies, direct action, and community events to defend the park. As a UC construction team arrived in July 1991, hundreds of protesters gathered to prevent the bulldozer from breaking ground. Several arrests were made.

Protests grew each day, and police escalated to shooting wood pellets and rubber bullets at demonstrators. More than 95 people were arrested in the first four days, and 3 people injured, including a photographer for the San Francisco Examiner. The Examiner later reported the total cost to UC of installing one sand volleyball court to be $1 million. UC reportedly paid individuals $15 per hour to play volleyball in order to make the courts appear to be in use, with round-the-clock police supervision. When a group slapped away a volleyball during play and dunked it into a porto-potty toilet, police tried to press charges against those responsible.

On December 15, 1991, the Daily Californian reported that "an unidentified vandal used a chainsaw to cut down the central wooden post of the volleyball court." The chainsaw is now displayed at the Long Haul Infoshop in Berkeley. The sand boxes remained until 1997, however, when UC finally removed them from the park.

2000s to 2010s 
In 2011, People's Park saw a new wave of protests, known as the "tree-sit." It consisted of a series of individual "tree-sitters" who occupied a wooden platform in one of the trees in People's Park. The protests were troubled by abrupt interruptions and altercations. One protester was arrested, another fell from the tree while sleeping. But despite the transitions and overlapping political platforms, such as the 10 PM curfew and the university's plans for development, the protests lasted throughout most of the fall of 2011. The tree-sits were also supported by Zachary RunningWolf, a Berkeley activist and several-time mayoral candidate, who actively spoke to the media about the protesters and the causes they were championing. RunningWolf claimed that the central motive for the protests was to demonstrate that "poverty is not a crime."

Despite the protests, in late 2011, UC Berkeley bulldozed the west end of People's Park, tearing up the decades-old community garden and plowing down mature trees in what a press release issued by the school described as an effort to provide students and the broader community with safer, more sanitary conditions. This angered some Berkeley students and residents, who noted that the bulldozing took place during winter break when many students were away from campus, and followed the administration-backed police response at Occupy Cal less than two months prior.

People's Park has been the subject of long-running contention between those who see it as a haven for the poor; and those who see it as essential green space south of campus and a memorial to the Free Speech Movement that is crime-infested and unfriendly to visitors and families. While the park has public bathrooms, gardens, and a playground area, many residents do not see it as a welcoming place, citing drug use and a high crime rate. A San Francisco Chronicle article on January 13, 2008, referred to People's Park as "a forlorn and somewhat menacing hub for drug users and the homeless." The same article quoted denizens and supporters of the park saying it was "perfectly safe, clean and accessible." In May 2018, UC Berkeley reported that campus police had been called 1,585 times to People's Park in the previous year. The university also said there had been 10,102 criminal incidents in the park between 2012 and 2017. A 2015 investigation by the Daily Californian found that most crimes reported at People's Park were related to "quality-of-life" such as drug and alcohol violations, and disorderly conduct, and that there were also multiple reports of battery, aggravated theft, robbery and assault at the park.

2018-2020: Proposed development 
In 2018, UC Berkeley unveiled a plan for People's Park that would include the construction of housing for as many as 1,000 students, supportive housing for the homeless or military veterans, and a memorial honoring the park's history and legacy. On August 29, 2019, Chancellor Carol T. Christ confirmed plans to create student housing for 600-1000 students, and supportive housing for 100-125 people. San Francisco-based LMS architects has been selected to build the housing, and Christ stated that they are moving to a time of "extensive public comment" on the plans for construction. The supportive housing is proposed to be built by a nonprofit, Resources for Community Development.

The People's Park Housing Project is part of the university's Long-Range Development Plan (LRDP). Updated nearly every 15 years, the LRDP is guided by the campus' commitments to maintaining "sustainability, being a good neighbor and community partner, as well as serving the people of California."  In February 2020, the university held its first public comment forum. Advocates of the park held a rally to protest the proposal, with students citing the historical, cultural, and social relevance of the park.

On April 17, 2020, the University of California, Berkeley published its plans for the People's Park Housing Project during its third virtual open house. Because of the COVID-19 pandemic, and the following shelter-in-place ordinances, the university moving forward with the plan was faced with significant backlash. The Mayor of Berkeley, Jesse Arreguín, wrote "I think we should launch this process at a time and in a way that allows full transparency and participation. I therefore reiterate my request that the campus delay the public comment period until after the Shelter in Place order is lifted."

On April 29, 2020, the Associated Students of the University of California (ASUC), planned to vote on re-establishing the nonpartisan housing commission. The commission would bring more transparency and communication between the UC Berkeley administration and the student body regarding campus housing projects, with collaboration with community non-profits like the People's Park Committee and Suitcase Clinic.

2021- Present: Defend People's Park and Redevelopment 
In January 2021, UC Berkeley erected fences around portions of People's Park to take core samples of the soil composition in preparation for construction. Homeless people who had set up tents in the park during the COVID-19 pandemic, were removed from the site by UC police. In response, a rally was organized on January 29. A mob was formed and as frustration grew, hundreds of people vandalized construction equipment, tore down the fences and carried them down Telegraph Avenue. Some were deposited on the front steps of the UC Berkeley administration building, Sproul Hall.

Occupation 

The following morning at 5am, new fences were erected around the northeast, Haste/Bowditch, corner of the park. When UC workers vacated the area, protesters opened the fence and began an overnight occupation in the fenced area until the threat of continued soil core sampling and fences ceased. The rallying cry "Defend People's Park" became pseudonymous with the protesters which led to the creation of a community group, "Defend People's Park".  As part of the occupation, resources such as tents and food were distributed to long-time park community members. Other events including gardening, film screening, and concerts were organized. The short-term demands and goals of the occupation included:

 An immediate halt and cancellation of any development plans in People's Park
 Defunding and disarming of UCPD
 Respecting the autonomy of park users and residents
 Expanding social and health services
 Communicating transparently about any proposed or current activity in the park.

In a statement issued shortly after the occupation began, UC Berkeley Chancellor Carol Christ described building on the park as a "a unique opportunity for a win-win-win-win." Defend People's Park released a statement in response, via Instagram, describing both the "student housing" and "supportive housing" developments proposed by the university as too expensive.

The park defense coalition and the cessation of UC development on People's Park received support from several UC Berkeley student organizations.

Throughout 2021 and 2022 Defend People's Park functioned as a community organization, hosting weekly activities at the park, including self-defense lessons, art classes, film screenings, concerts, dances, karaoke, and bar-be-que dinners. A follow-up protest occurred on March 8. Another protest on April 25 was co-organized with tenants from 1921 Walnut St. — a small old apartment building UC Berkeley purchased in 2020 to be torn down to make way for a modern and much larger apartment building in 2022.

Ongoing demolition efforts and protests 

Just after midnight on August 3, 2022, the UC Berkeley Police Department and contractors began fencing off People's Park. Protesters gathered after multiple "Bulldozer" alerts were shared when workers began unloading heavy machinery and construction equipment into the park. A livestream on the Instagram account, @PeoplesParkBerkeley, shared near constant live footage from midnight to noon on August 3, most of which is still publicly available on the page. At about 3 a.m., activists tried to block the movement of machinery into the park by lying on the road, and arrests were made. Without prior warning, all civilian vehicles were towed away from Haste and Bowditch Streets. Throughout the early hours of the morning, the number of protesters grew to a few dozen and over 120 California State University Critical Response Unit police officers along with Highway Patrol officers and private security guards arrived at People's Park. Protesters successfully opened the fences surrounding the park multiple times but were unable to breach the line of policemen who retaliated violently, striking one woman over the head with a baton, shoving a baton against the throat of another protester, tackling one woman to the ground, grabbing crutches away from one protester, shoving an eldery protester, and more. By noon, 47 trees in People's Park were cut down by a local company, Expert tree Services, including Redwoods, Coast Live Oak, a palm tree, a pomegranate tree, an apple tree, an apricate tree, and a Blackwood acacia.

Police stated that protesters also threw objects at construction workers, which protesters have refuted. This was accompanied by a protest at the nearby Sproul Plaza on the UC Berkeley campus. Demonstrators marched down Telegraph Avenue and Haste Street, coalescing at the park. By noon, the university decided to pull out construction crews; UC Berkeley officials said this was due to "destruction of construction materials, unlawful protest activities and violence on the part of some." Hours later the university announced that construction work at People's Park would be temporarily paused.

On August 4, a special City Council meeting was canceled by mayor Jesse Arreguín. The meeting was scheduled a day after confrontations with law enforcement occurred, in order to discuss lifting Berkeley's ban on the use of tear gas and pepper spray by police. The June 2020 ban was put in place by a unanimous vote, with mayor Arreguín saying at the time that tear gas "is banned in warfare and should not be used on our streets or in protests." The mayor said he initially called for the August 4 meeting following the protests at People's Park, but later said that he "came to the conclusion that it was the wrong approach and that the ban on tear gas should remain." The mayor stated that he supports the university's housing project, but said that "it’s understandable that people are very concerned and upset about the construction at the park" and that there is a need to "make sure that people can protest peacefully, and make sure we are protecting the safety of the broader community at the same time."

On August 5, the California First District Court of Appeal upheld a stay on construction, demolition and tree-cutting. This court order will temporarily pause further development work at People's Park until the legal issue is resolved. UC Berkeley does however have the legal right to fence the perimeter of the park. In response to the ruling, People’s Park Historic District Advocacy Group President Harvey Smith said "We are hopeful that the court will overturn the lower court decision and lead to the restoration of the park. Why should the university keep a parking lot and destroy a park? In the era of extreme climate change, this is unconscionable."

Reactions to development plans 
In the aftermath of the occupation of the People's Park Construction Site, the student body of UC Berkeley protested the vandalism of construction equipment and destruction of university property by launching a satirical campaign called "Bring Costco Park." This movement called on Costco and Raising Cane's to jointly purchase the site and build a warehouse there. This movement gained widespread support among students. On August 4, 2022, CounterPunch published an open letter, stating in part: "Created, maintained and loved by regular folks for over five decades, it is an acre and a half of living history—of a time when the powerful and the greedy were called to answer for their destruction and devastation.  I believe this symbolism is what the University and its allies wish to destroy; that this is the reason they insist on building new housing in the Park when multiple other properties exist for such construction." An August 12, 2022, opinion piece in Berkeleyside stated that for many years now, pro-development interests have "painted the park as a benighted, desolate no man's land where the homeless hunker down, strew their belongings, lineup for free food, and scrape together scary lives circled by chaos and violence." And that it is "in UC Berkeley’s interest to promote" this image.

Past community involvement

Green infrastructure 
When the Park was established in 1969, located between the Derby and Potters watershed, it became one of the oldest natural storm water management systems in Southside, Berkeley. The park is home to a communal vegetable garden. Community members meet every Saturday afternoon to cultivate these plants.

Mutual aid 
Community organizations visit the Park regularly bringing supplies, food, services, and resources to the residents of the Park as well as community members. The Suitcase Clinic as well as the Berkeley Outreach Coalition visit weekly on Mondays and Tuesdays. The Cal Sikh Student Association provides clothes and meals every month. Food Not Bombs serves hot meals at the Park every day.

Free Box 
The park has seen various projects come and go over the decades. The "Free Box" operated as a clothes donation drop-off site for many years until it was destroyed by arson in 1995. Subsequent attempts to rebuild it were dismantled by University police. As such, it is now defunct.

National historical recognition 
People's Park was officially listed on the National Register of Historic Places on May 24, 2022.

See also 

1960s Berkeley protests
Earth Peoples Park
Guerrilla gardening
Rosebud Denovo
South Central Farm

Notes

References 
California Governor's Office. The "People's Park" - A Report on the Confrontation at Berkeley, California. Submitted to Gov. Ronald Reagan. July 1, 1969.
Gruen, Gruen and Associates. Southside Student Housing Project Preliminary Environmental Study. Report to UCB Chancellor. February 1974.
People's Park Handbills. Distributed May–April 1969. Located at the Bancroft Library, University of California, Berkeley.
Pichirall, Joe. The Daily Californian. Cover Story on People's Park. May 16, 1969.
"Reagan's Reaction to Riot: Call Park Here 'Excuse'" The Daily Californian. May 16, 1969.
Statement on People's Park. University of California, Berkeley – Office of Public Information. April 30, 1969.
Weiss, Norman. The Daily Californian. "People's Park: Then & Now." March 17, 1997.

Further reading 
 Compost, Terri (ed.) (2009) People's Park: Still Blooming. Slingshot! Collective. . Includes original photos and materials.
 Dalzell, Tom (Foreword by Todd Gitlin, Afterword by Steve Wasserman) (2019) Battle for People's Park, Berkeley 1969. Heyday Books . Eyewitness testimonies and hundreds of remarkable, often previously unpublished photographs.
 Rorabaugh, W. J. Berkeley at War: The 1960s (1990)

External links 

 People's Park official page
 People's Park at the official City of Berkeley website – archived from the original on November 7, 2016

Parks in Berkeley, California
Guerrilla gardening
History of Berkeley, California
University of California, Berkeley
Culture of Berkeley, California
Crime in the San Francisco Bay Area
Police brutality in the United States
Military history of California
Military in the San Francisco Bay Area
Politics of the San Francisco Bay Area
1969 in California
Tourist attractions in Berkeley, California
Riots and protests at UC Berkeley
Protests in the San Francisco Bay Area
National Register of Historic Places in Alameda County, California